TVC Deportes is a Mexican sports channel, founded August 11, 2007. Currently only can be viewed through cable television systems in Mexico. Its programming combines both national and international sports, a sports news program (TVC Deportes Total), and several analysis programs dedicated to other sports.

Is part of TVC Networks, is the business unit of PCTV (In Spanish:Productora de Comercializacion de Television por Cable) engaged in planning, design, development, production and distribution of audiovisual content.

In 2007 TVC Deportes signed a deal with CONADE to broadcast sports events of that organization.

Media Coverage 

American Football:
Liga de Fútbol Americano Profesional
Lingerie Football League
NCAA

Baseball:
Mexican Baseball League
Mexican Pacific League

Basketball:
Liga Nacional de Baloncesto Profesional

Football:
Ascenso MX
Copa MX
Liga Premier
Liga MX Femenil
FIFA World Cup: 2014 and 2018 matches live

Tennis:
Davis Cup
WTA

Wrestling:
Consejo Mundial de Lucha Libre

Other Sports:
Olympic Games 2016 and 2020.

References

Television networks in Mexico
Sports television networks